Now the Hell Will Start: One Soldier's Flight from the Greatest Manhunt of World War II (2008) is a narrative nonfiction history book by United States author Brendan I. Koerner.

It investigates and recounts the story of Herman Perry, an African-American World War II soldier assigned in the China-Burma-India theatre of the war. Perry killed a white officer while helping construct the Ledo Road. He subsequently retreated into the Indo-Burmese wilderness and joined a tribe of the headhunting Nagas, successfully joining one village and marrying the fourteen-year-old daughter of one of the tribesmen.

It also relates some of the history of the CBI theatre as it pertains to Herman Perry's, as well as explores the injustices of the Jim Crow mentality and policies carried out by the military during World War II.

In February 2009, American director Spike Lee purchased the film rights to the book.

References

External links
Now the Hell Will Start, official site

Herman Perry: Now The Hell Will Start, book excerpt in The Telegraph, 3 August 2008

2008 non-fiction books
History books about World War II
Headhunting accounts and studies